Central Building may refer to:
 Central Building (Hong Kong)
 Central Building (Seattle), Washington, United States
 BMW Central Building, Leipzig, Germany
 New York Central Building